Shinyanga Urban District is one of the eight districts of the Shinyanga Region of Tanzania and includes the city of Shinyanga.  It is bordered to the north by the Mwanza Region, to the south by the Shinyanga Rural District, to the east by the Kishapu District and to the west by the Kahama Urban District.

According to the 2002 Tanzania National Census, the population of the Shinyanga Urban District was 135,166.

Wards
The Shinyanga Urban District is administratively divided into 17 wards:

 Chamaguha
 Chibe
 Lubaga
 Ibadakuli
 Ibinzamata
 Kambarage
 Kitangili
 Kizumbi
 Nkolandoto
 Mwamalili
 Old Shinyanga
 Mwawaza
 Ndala
 Masekelo
 Ngokolo
 Ndembezi
 Mjini

References

Districts of Shinyanga Region